Finding Bigfoot is an American reality television series that aired on Animal Planet. The program followed four "researchers" and explorers investigating potential evidence of Bigfoot, a cryptid hominid allegedly living in the wildernesses of the United States and Canada. While the Finding Bigfoot team never captured photographic evidence of the creature's existence, the show gained high ratings and was a top earner for Animal Planet. It premiered on May 29, 2011, and the series finale and 100th episode was released on May 27, 2018.

Premise
The team consists of Bigfoot Field Researchers Organization (BFRO) founder and President Matt Moneymaker, researchers James "Bobo" Fay & Cliff “Chuck” Barackman, and skeptical scientist Ranae Holland. The series never questions the existence of bigfoot, but rather documents the team's futile search efforts and study of potential evidence in an attempt to prove the existence of the creature.

Over the course of the series, the team has introduced many new bigfoot related terms into the American vernacular. For example, the term "bigfoot" is rarely used in favor of "squatch" (short for sasquatch). Their investigations are referred to as "squatchin'". The areas they investigate are often described as "Squatchy", with Washington having been described as "the squatchiest state."

Cast
Matt Moneymaker:
Moneymaker is the founder and president of the Bigfoot Field Researchers Organization (founded in 1995). Moneymaker was born and raised in Los Angeles, California, and moved to Ohio in the 2000s. He has been researching bigfoot for 30 years.
Cliff Barackman:
Born and raised in Long Beach, California, Barackman currently resides in Portland, Oregon. The evidence analyst of the group has been a dedicated sasquatch field researcher for the past two decades who has been known to spend over 200 days a year in the field. He is also an accomplished jazz guitarist holding a Bachelor of Arts degree from California State University, Long Beach.
James "Bobo" Fay:
The field caller was born and raised in Manhattan Beach, California, and has been interested in bigfoot since the 1980s. The tallest and burliest member of the team, he is the one most often used to stand in for bigfoot in reconstructions. Fay is known for his "Gone Squatchin" hat, and often wears other bigfoot-related attire. He and Barackman are close friends and searched for Bigfoot together before the series started. In 2014, Boston Red Sox second baseman Dustin Pedroia met Fay at Fenway Park before a game and gave him an autographed baseball bat with a Sasquatch logo on the bottom of it.
Ranae Holland:
The skeptical member of the cast is a field biologist born and raised in Sioux Falls, South Dakota. While she is not a member of the BFRO, and does not believe in Bigfoot, her interest in the creature was fueled by her father's fascination with the phenomenon. As a child, she and her father spent quality time together "squatching" and watching bigfoot movies.

Episodes

An episode begins with the Finding Bigfoot team driving to a location on the trail of photographic, video, audio, or eyewitness evidence of a Bigfoot. The team will go to the location where the evidence was gathered from, and speak to the person who gathered the evidence. If it is a photograph or a video, the team will perform a recreation and a size comparison of the event, using the same camera that the witness used. The team then performs their first night investigation at that same location.

Starting with the second season, one member of the team will almost always remain at the location for a solo night investigation for several more nights. The other three (or all four in the first season) members will then head to a 'town hall meeting' to which members of the public are invited to come and share their Bigfoot encounter stories. In some heavily Bigfoot reported areas, such as Washington, these events are sometimes invite only.

After the witnesses tell their encounter stories, they are asked to mark their sighting locations on a map, which the team then uses to look for a pattern of sightings. The team will then visit three of the best-reported encounters, that are usually close to one another. After visiting all three witnesses, the team will collect the member who was doing the solo night investigation and select an area to do their final night investigation.

For the final night investigation, the team usually devises a unique plan to try to attract a Bigfoot, usually involving noise or light, by using boats on a lake, or silent electric ATVs. They also do wood knocks, which is believed to mimic a bigfoot's communication. Night-vision technology and forward looking infrared (FLIR) cameras are used to document these investigations. They will then evaluate what they learned and announce their evaluations during the ending credits. Occasionally, they will show their trail cam pictures or DNA results following the credits/summary.

In the third season, the team expanded their search from North America to investigate the Sasquatch phenomenon known as "Yowies" in Australia. Later in the season, they traveled to Indonesia searching for the "Orang Pendek", and to Vietnam to search for the "Wildman". In season four, the team traveled to China in search of the "Yeren", and Nepal in search of the "Yeti". In later seasons, the team traveled to other countries, including the United Kingdom and Brazil.

Season 5 of Finding Bigfoot debuted on June 8, 2014, as opposed to November when the last two seasons started.

On October 20, 2017, the Finding Bigfoot cast and crew revisited California to attend the 50th anniversary festival while filming the 100th and finale episode of the show. It aired on May 27, 2018 on Animal Planet. It was entitled "Return of the Legend".

On February 8, 2021, the series returned for a two-hour special entitled "Finding Bigfoot: The Search Continues."  The special features the return of all four original cast members and focuses on utilizing new, advanced technologies to ultimately prove Bigfoot's existence.  It was made available exclusively on the streaming service Discovery+.. The special aired on Animal Planet for the first time on September 6, 2021.

Reception
Animal Planet received criticism for Finding Bigfoot and Mermaids: The Body Found for their "outlandishness”. Fay defended Finding Bigfoot, and to draw a line between the two programs. "You can't equate bigfoot with mermaids."

Several episodes of the first season received heavy criticism from the four 'Finding Bigfoot' members themselves, for the editing style that Animal Planet used, to make it appear that a horse and a person were unidentified by the team, and what they were remained unknown. The second event, involving the horse, led the team to threaten to quit the show if such techniques were used again.

Finding Bigfoot ranked among Animal Planet's top rated programs throughout its run. It has spawned two spin-offs: Finding Bigfoot: Further Evidence and Finding Bigfoot: Rejected Evidence. Finding Bigfoot: Further Evidence is similar to VH-1's Pop-Up Video. Episodes of Finding Bigfoot are re-aired with "info nuggets" from the team members. Finding Bigfoot: Rejected Evidence is an online-only series, in which executive producer Keith Hoffman airs video deemed not worthy of inclusion on the show.

Bigfoot enthusiasts have often ridiculed the show, due to the team's consistent lack of success, and the fact that any footage of a Bigfoot would be reported long before an episode airs.

See also
 MonsterQuest

References

External links

Bigfoot Field Researchers Organization (BFRO)

2011 American television series debuts
Animal Planet original programming
Bigfoot
Television about Bigfoot
Cryptozoological television series